Illinois River Bridge may refer to:

Illinois River Bridge (Pedro, Arkansas), listed on the National Register of Historic Places (NRHP)
Illinois River Bridge at Phillips Ford, in Savoy, Arkansas, listed on the NRHP in Washington County, Arkansas
Illinois River Bridge (Siloam Springs, Arkansas), listed on the NRHP in Benton County, Arkansas

See also 
 Illinois River (disambiguation)